Ken S. Polk is an American sound engineer. He won three Primetime Emmy Awards and was nominated for eleven more in the category Outstanding Sound Mixing.

Film credits 
In the Mouth of Madness (1994)
Batman Forever (1995)
Under Siege 2: Dark Territory (1995)
Heat (1995)
Grumpier Old Men (1995)
Trial and Error (1997)
Lethal Weapon 4 (1998)
The Whole Nine Yards (2000)
Around the Bend (2004)
Crank (2006)
Lars and the Real Girl (2007)
The Good Night (2007)

References

External links 

Living people
Year of birth missing (living people)
Place of birth missing (living people)
American audio engineers
20th-century American engineers
21st-century American engineers
Primetime Emmy Award winners